Holly Grove Christian School is a Christian private school located in Westover, Somerset County, Maryland. The school was established in 1976 by Holly Grove Mennonite Church.

Academics 
Holly Grove is accredited by ACSI and the Middle States Association of Colleges and Schools.

Lower School 
Holly Grove offers classes for lower-school students from grade level PreK-4 up through 6th Grade.

Middle and High School 
Holly Grove offers core subject classes for middle and high school students as well as elective classes. These electives include Business, Music, Art, and Spanish 1-3. Holly Grove's AP offerings include Literature, Language, Statistics, Calculus AB, World History, and US History. Holly Grove also offers online classes.

Demographics 
The demographic breakdown of the 551 students enrolled in the 2017-2018 school year was:
 Asian - 2.90%
 Black - 3.81%
 Hispanic - 0.91%
 White - 86.21%
 Native Hawaiian/Pacific Islander - 0.18%

References 

Schools in Somerset County, Maryland
Christian schools in Maryland
Mennonite schools in the United States
Mennonitism in Maryland